Akah Nnani is a Nigerian actor, TV host, content creator, and YouTuber, well known for his supporting role in Banana Island Ghost, which earned him a nomination at the 14th, and 15th editions of The AMA Awards in the Best Actor in a Supporting Role category in 2018 and 2019. In 2022, he returned to screen with a lead role in the Netflix Original movie, Man of God, as Samuel Obalolu.

Early life

Akah Nnani hails from Imo State, and was born on January 31, in Port Harcourt, Nigeria, with three siblings. His father is an immigration officer and his mother is a businesswoman. He attended Pampers Private School, in Surulere, for his elementary education, and had his secondary education, at Topgrade Secondary School, in Surulere. He graduated with a B.Sc. in Mass Communication from Covenant University.

Career
In September 2014, Akah Nnani started a vlog channel on YouTube, known as "Akah Bants", and was in the lead role of One Chance as the character of Sly in the Ndani TV web-series, released on July 15, 2015. In December 2015, he resigns as the co-host, of "Entertainment Splash", a TV program on TVC Entertainment (formerly Television Continental), to focus on his YouTube Vlog channel. On 12 July 2016, he was in the cast of On the Real as the character of Efosa in the EbonyLife television-series. Nnani, alongside Olu Jacobs, and Joke Silva's was in the cast of Heartbeat The Musical, a 19-day stage-play, written by Tosin Otudeko, and Debo Oluwatuminu. On February 8, 2017, Accelerate TV premiered its first episode of Shade Corner, a web-TV show, hosted by Akah Nnani, alongside Makida Moka, Adebayo Oke-Lawal, King Cam and Noble Ezeala.

On 24 May 2017, Nnani appeared in the cast of Isoken, as the character of Ifeayin. On 4 August 2017, he starred in Banana Island Ghost, in a minor role as a Sergeant, which earned him two nominations in the Best Actor in a Supporting Role category in the 14th, and 15th Africa Movie Academy Awards. He also starred in Ratnik, Lara and the Beat, The Royal Hibiscus Hotel, and Omo Ghetto: The Saga. In 2019, Funke Akindele recruited him to join Jenifa's Diary in its 14th season, as the character of Anthony, playing the role of Jenifa's P.A. In 2021, Enterprise Life Nigeria, a subsidiary of Enterprise Group, recurred Akah Nnani as the host of This Is Life, a YouTube podcast show, first premiered on 26 August, with guess appearance from Ric Hassani, Wana Udobang, Wofai Fada, and Precious Emmanuel. On 22 October 2021, he starred in Ghana Jollof, as Romanus in the Showmax Original comedy television series. On 16 April 2022, he was in cast of  Netflix Original Man of God, as the character of Samuel Obalolu.

Personal life
On 29 January 2019, Akah Nnani, engaged Claire Idera. They both had their traditional engagement on 8 April 2019 and married on 12 April 2019.

On 8 February 2021, they both welcome their first daughter, Chizaram Gabrielle Eriife Amaris Nnani.

Filmography
List of filmographies by Akah Nnani.

Television

Stage

Awards and nominations

References

External links
 

Living people
Nigerian male television actors
Nigerian male film actors
Male actors from Lagos State
Year of birth missing (living people)
Nigerian media personalities
Nigerian YouTubers
Nigerian television presenters